The International Federation of Building and Wood Workers (IFBWW) was a global union federation of trade unions in the building, building materials, wood, forestry and allied industries.

History
The federation was established in 1934 by a merger of the International Federation of Building Workers and International Federation of Wood Workers. The International Secretariat of Stone Masons and the International Secretariat of Painters and Allied Trades later joined the organisation. , it had 287 member organisations in 124 countries, representing a combined membership of more than 10 million workers.

The IFBWW was based in Geneva and had a network of regional offices. The organisation worked closely with the International Trade Union Confederation (ITUC) and the other global union federations, and had Special Consultative Status at the Economic and Social Committee of the United Nations.

The IFBWW held a congress every four years, consisting of delegates from the member organisations. The congress established priorities and strategy for the organisation, and elected the Executive Committee. which met immediately before and after the congress, and at the midpoint of the congress period. As supreme governing body during the intercongress period, it was responsible for all policies and operations of the IFBWW. The Executive Committee appointed a Management Committee, which was responsible for the administration of the IFBWW and for the implementation of its policies.

At its congress in Buenos Aires on 9 December 2005 the IFBWW merged with the World Federation of Building and Wood Workers (WFBW) to create a new joint global union federation, the Building and Wood Workers' International.

Affiliates
As of 2005, the following unions were affiliated to the federation:

Leadership

General Secretaries
1934: Jaap van Achterbergh
1948: Jan Leliveld
1951: Arne Hagen
1966: John Löfblad
1989: Ulf Asp
2001: Anita Normark

Presidents
1934: Richard Coppock
1960: Dore Smets
1966: James H. Mills
1969: Bram Buijs
1985: Konrad Carl
1993: Bruno Köbele
1997: Roel De Vries

References

External links

 Building and Wood Workers' International

 
Building and Wood Workers' International
Woodworking
Trade unions established in 1934
Trade unions disestablished in 2005